C1C is an abbreviation that can stand for:

 Cadet First Class, the rank of a cadet in his or her fourth and final (senior) year at the United States Air Force Academy